About 8,000 fellows have been elected to the Royal Society of London since its inception in 1660.
Below is a  list of people who are or were Fellow or Foreign Member of the Royal Society.
The date of election to the fellowship follows the name.
Dates in brackets relate to an award or event associated with the person.
The Society maintains complete online list. This list is complete up to and including 2019.

List of fellows

D

E

F

Foreign members

D

E

F

References

External links
The Royal Society website
Complete List of Royal Society Fellows 1660-2007 in pdf format
Fellows index
Archive of MacTutor History of Mathematics

Fellows of the Royal Society
DEF